Peter James Eele (27 January 1935 – 25 January 2019) was an English first-class cricketer who played for Somerset and was later a first-class umpire.

Eele was a lower-order left-handed batsman and a wicketkeeper. He was the reserve wicketkeeper to Harold Stephenson at Somerset in the late 1950s and early 1960s, and his first-class cricket career was dictated largely by Stephenson's state of health. So 43 of Eele's 54 first-class matches came in two seasons: 1958, when Stephenson was injured for the second half of the season, and 1964, when Stephenson was able to play only three times. When Stephenson left the county somewhat unwillingly at the end of the 1964 season, Somerset recruited Geoff Clayton of Lancashire as his wicketkeeping replacement. Eele stayed as Clayton's deputy for a couple of seasons, but then left the staff.

Eele's batting was his weak point. He passed 40 in a first-class innings only once, though he then went on to make an unbeaten 103 against the Pakistan Eaglets team in 1963. As a wicketkeeper, he was "tidy and unshowy".

After leaving Somerset, Eele played Minor Counties cricket for Devon. From 1981 to 1984 and then again from 1989 to 1990 he was on the first-class umpires list.

References

External links
 

1935 births
2019 deaths
English cricketers
English cricket umpires
Somerset cricketers
Devon cricketers
International Cavaliers cricketers
Sportspeople from Taunton
Wicket-keepers